Duméril's fringe-fingered lizard (Acanthodactylus dumerilii) is a species of lizard in the family Lacertidae. A. dumerilii is in the A. scutellatus species group. A. dumerilii is native to the western and central Sahara.

Etymology
The specific name, dumerilii, is in honor of French herpetologist André Marie Constant Duméril.

Description
Duméril's fringe-fingered lizard is overall yellowish brown, as are many fringed fingered lizards. Its body is gracile and elongated. It has long fingers with fringe-like scales, which gave the genus its common name. It can be distinguished from A. longipes by the presence of contrasting dark brown or black spots across the dorsal surface.

Habitat and geographic range
The typical habitat of Duméril's fringe-fingered lizard is mainly found in the deserts of Algeria, Libya, Morocco, Mauritania, Senegal, Tunisia and the Western Sahara. In the areas of Erg Chebbi and M’hamid of Southern Morocco it is found together with Acanthodactylus longipes. However, these closely related species prefer different habitats. Duméril's fringe-fingered lizard avoids deserts free of vegetation and is mainly found at the edges of dunes overgrown by some bushes and halfa grass (Stipa tenacissima), or lives in soil covered with sparse vegetation, where it constructs its burrows.

Diet and ecology

Silver ants
Duméril's fringe-fingered lizard eats insects, mainly Saharan silver ants. These ants have large soldiers with saber-like mandibles for defending against the lizard. If the lizard cannot dig up the underground colony, it places its burrow near the colony to exploit over a longer time.  The silver ants in turn have special scouts who watch the burrow of the fringed lizard and alert the workers as soon as the lizard enters the burrow to protect itself from the heat of the sun, upon which the ants swarm out to gather food.

Locusts
Occasional locust swarms also supply Duméril's fringed lizard with food. However, some locust species such as the desert locust consume toxic plants like the  Egyptian henbane, accumulating noxious substances. The locusts develop a warning coloration at higher population density, which is noticeably intensified to indicate their potential toxicity. Duméril's fringe-fingered lizard avoids desert locusts with such coloration.

Reproduction
A. dumerilii is oviparous.

References

Further reading
Milne-Edwards H (1829). "Recherches zoologiques pour servir à l'histoire des Lézards, extraites d'une Monographie de ce genre". Annales des Sciences Naturelles, Paris 16: 50–89 + Plates V–VIII. (Lacerta dumerilii, new species, p. 85 + Plate VII, figure 9). (in French).
Sindaco R, Jeremčenko VK (2008). The Reptiles of the Western Palearctic. 1. Annotated Checklist and Distributional Atlas of the Turtles, Crocodiles, Amphisbaenians and Lizards of Europe, North Africa, Middle East and Central Asia. (Monographs of the Societas Herpetologica Italica). Latina, Italy: Edizioni Belvedere. 580 pp. .
Schlüter U (2010). "Fransenfingereidechsen (Acanthodactylus) in der Natur und im Terrarium. Teil 5b: Die Acanthodactylus-scutellatus-Gruppe". Reptilia 15 (4): 62–66.
Trape J-F, Trape S, Chirio L (2012). Lézards, crocodiles et tortues d'Afrique occidentale et du Sahara. Paris: IRD Orstom. 503 pp. . (in French).

Lacertidae
Taxa named by Henri Milne-Edwards